Justo Justo (September 21, 1941 – May 18, 2012) was a Filipino columnist and Pasay city councilor. He was known as a flamboyant AIDS activist.

Early life
Panfilo C. Justo, widely known as Justo C. Justo or simply JJ, came from a poor family in the sitio of Manlumay, Leyte. He was born to Francisco Justo Sr.  and Ma. Lourdes Milagros Cagoco on September 21, 1941. JJ sold local delicacies to support his elementary education. As a consistent honor student he graduated as valedictorian of the Barangay Palarao Elementary School. His father wanted him to become a lawyer, but after his early death JJ had to take care of his younger brother Francisco Jr. (Frank) and sister Edith.

Career
JJ enrolled at the Rizal Central Colleges in Pasay to pursue his high school education. They left Leyte when he was in third year at the Calubian High School.

JJ sold roasted corn and lugaw to support his studies. He finished high school as Most Outstanding Graduate.

JJ's boyhood hobbies included sketching men’s and ladies apparel, writing both poetry and prose, including Visayan lyrics for popular American songs. 
His stepfather Cecilio Pamintuan, novelist and movie writer, gave JJ his first training in journalism. He was later encouraged and helped in his writing by novelists Rico Bello Omagap, Orlando Nadres and Pablo Gomez.

In 1968 he joined the staff of the former newspaper Philippine Sun, which allowed him to develop his controversial writing style. He was the first to be published using swardspeak.

JJ founded Pasay Aids Watch and Information Drive (PAWID), and used his own foundation JJ Barangayan (Phils.) Foundation, Inc. to fight against the spread of AIDS.

Justo used to host a television program titled Etchos Lang, and gained attention for the cause when he convinced AIDS victim Sarah Jane Salazar to share her story to the public.

He also played a leading part in the establishment of the "Home for the Golden Gays", a retirement home for homosexuals such as Walter Dempster.

Political life
JJ was among the first media celebrities to make the transition to public office. 
He started his career in the political arena as a Kagawad and later became a barangay chairman in 1987. 
He became a councilor of Pasay in the 1980s, and completed three terms.

Personal life
He married Adela, by whom he had two daughters, Maria Louela Justo-Galvez and Ma. Milagros Justo-Miyazawa.

Death
Justo died on May 18, 2012, at the Philippine General Hospital. 
He had been bedridden for a year with spinal column problems due to diabetes.

His remains were interred at Golden Haven Memorial, Las Piñas.

Filmography

Actor

Writing & crew

See also
Home for the Golden Gays
Walterina Markova

References

External links

1941 births
2012 deaths
People from Leyte (province)
People from Pasay
Writers from Metro Manila
Filipino LGBT writers
Filipino columnists
Filipino activists
HIV/AIDS activists
Deaths from diabetes
Metro Manila city and municipal councilors
Filipino LGBT politicians